Ireland–Libya relations began in 1977. Ireland is accredited to Libya from its embassy in Rome, Italy. Libya is accredited to Ireland from its embassy in London, United Kingdom.

Ireland-Libya relations under Muammar Gaddafi
Under Muammar Gaddafi, the prime governor of Libya from 1969 to 2011, relations between both countries were strained due to Gaddaffi's support of the Irish Republican Army. Gaddafi was sympathetic to their cause and also wanted revenge for the US Air Force's bombing attacks on Tripoli and Benghazi in 1986. In late 1987 French authorities stopped a merchant vessel, the MV Eksund, which was delivering a 150-ton Libyan arms shipment to the IRA. When the Troubles were raging in Northern Ireland, three ships of the Irish Naval Service intercepted a ship carrying weapons from Libya which were probably destined for Irish Republican paramilitaries. Between 1984 and 1987 Libya sent the IRA about 1,000 AK47 assault rifles and six tonnes of Semtex explosive alongside other weapons. This shipment ensured The Troubles could continue for many more years, mainly until the Good Friday Agreement of 1998 ended the conflict. In 1976 after a series of bombings by the Provisional IRA, Gaddafi announced that "the bombs which are convulsing Britain and breaking its spirit are the bombs of Libyan people. We have sent them to the Irish revolutionaries so that the British will pay the price for their past deeds".
After December 1985 Rome and Vienna airport attacks, which killed 19 and wounded around 140, Gaddafi indicated that he would continue to support the Irish Republican Army as long as European countries support anti-Gaddafi Libyans. The Foreign Minister of Libya also called the massacres "heroic acts".

Beef trade
Under Charles Haughey the Irish government made trade delegations to ensure that the lucrative beef trade would remain open between the two countries. The issue was covered in a 2019 RTÉ documentary In League with Gaddafi.

League of Ireland

In December 1989, future Ireland manager, Brian Kerr brought a joint St. Patrick’s Athletic/Bohemians representative team, travelled to play Al-Ahly in the March 28 Stadium.

References

 
Ireland
Libya